Romany relates or may refer to:

The Romani people or Romany people, also known as Gypsies
Romani language or Romany language, the language of the Romani people
"Romany", the pseudonym of a broadcaster and writer of Romani descent, George Bramwell Evens
Romany (album), an album by The Hollies, released in 1972
Romany Wisdom, comic book character and sister to X-Men ally Pete Wisdom
Romany Malco, an American actor
Romany, the Diva of Magic, professional magicienne
Romany, Podlaskie Voivodeship (north-east Poland)
Romany, Warmian-Masurian Voivodeship (north Poland)
Ramana, Azerbaijan, near Baku
Romany is a female given name. It is the feminine form of Romanus, which means "a citizen of Rome".